Shine On is an album by American country music artist George Jones, released in March 1983 on the Epic Records label.

Background
Shine On was Jones's sixth album in three years, a prolific comeback that had been spearheaded by his 1980 single "He Stopped Loving Her Today".  His chart success continued unabated in March 1983, with the album producing what turned out to be his last number one song "I Always Get Lucky With You".  "Tennessee Whiskey" and the title track were also top five hits.  The most remarkable thing about Jones during this period, considering how he had been abusing himself with alcohol and drugs, is how his voice did not give out on him; in fact, many believe his singing was at its zenith and, judging by the performances on Shine On (which peaked at number 7), he remained remarkably engaged.  His performance on the Bobby Braddock song "She Hung The Moon" in particular is virtuosic, with producer Billy Sherrill providing a musical tapestry for the track that brings Frank Sinatra to mind (in an often-quoted tribute, Sinatra called Jones "the second best singer in America").  The album is also notable for the novelty "Ol' George Stopped Drinkin' Today", which - in addition to punning Jones's most famous song's title - pokes fun at his notorious reputation, much like his duet with Merle Haggard, "No Show Jones", did the year before.

Reception
Eugene Chadbourne of AllMusic calls Jones "a miracle worker vocally, shedding a light on the lyrics to 'She Hung the Moon' that is every bit as deep as moonlight, sounding every bit like a normal human being when he admits 'I'd Rather Have What We Had,' and rising to the challenge of freshly performing a stale country chestnut, 'Almost Persuaded.'

Track listing

Personnel
Bass guitar: Henry Strzelecki
Dobro: Pete Drake
Drums: Larrie Londin, Kenny Malone
Guitar: Pete Bordonali, Billy Sanford, Bobby Thompson, Reggie Young
Harmonica: Terry McMillan
Keyboards: Bobby Ogdin, Hargus "Pig" Robbins
Steel Guitar: Pete Drake, Weldon Myrick

External links
George Jones' Official Website
Record Label

George Jones albums
1983 albums
Albums produced by Billy Sherrill
Epic Records albums